The fourth season of the reality television series Black Ink Crew: Chicago aired on VH1 from May 30, 2018 until September 19, 2018. It chronicles the daily operations and staff drama at an African American owned and operated tattoo shop 9MAG located in Chicago, Illinois.

Main cast

Ryan Henry
Charmaine Walker
Phor Brumfield
Don Brumfield
Danielle Jamison
Van Johnson
Liliana Barrios

Recurring cast
Ashley P
Cobra Kat
JR Diaz
Nikki
Rachel
Jenn
Terrence
Reese
Bella
Neekbey
Slam

Episodes

References

2018 American television seasons
Black Ink Crew